Wout Holverda (22 April 1958 – 3 December 2021) was a Dutch football striker who played most of his career for Sparta Rotterdam.

Club career
A speedy and stocky forward, Holverda started his professional football career at Sparta and played seven seasons for them, ending up as their top goalscorer in the 1983–84 season. That earned him a move to Fortuna Sittard, where he played alongside British striker John Linford, but a niggling groin injury did not make him a success at Fortuna and he spent his last seasons at HFC Haarlem before retiring. He scored 61 goals in over 150 games in all competitions for Sparta and 14 in 70 games for Fortuna.

With Sparta as well as with Fortuna he played European Cup matches, 11 games in total (4 goals).

International career
Holverda played once for Jong Oranje, coming on as a substitute for Ron Jans against Poland in May 1979. He received a call-up for the senior side who were playing Denmark in 1984, but did not play.

Personal life

Alzheimer's disease
Holverda was diagnosed with Alzheimer's disease that prevented him from visiting Sparta matches. In September 2013, a group of supporters decided to help him and drive Holverda to Sparta matches for the remainder of the season.

Death
He died from COVID-19 on 3 December 2021, at the age of 63.

External links
 
 Career stats - Voetbal International 
 Player bio - Sparta fanzine In The Winning Mood 
 Player bio at Fortuna - Fortuna

References

1958 births
2021 deaths
People with Alzheimer's disease
Dutch footballers
Footballers from Leiden
Association football forwards
Netherlands under-21 international footballers
Eredivisie players
Sparta Rotterdam players
Fortuna Sittard players
HFC Haarlem players
Deaths from the COVID-19 pandemic in the Netherlands